Desportivo Amador da Empresa Agostinho is a football club that plays in the island of São Tomé in São Tomé and Príncipe. It is based in the village of Agostinho Neto west of the national capital São Tomé.  The team plays in the São Tomé Island League's second division.  It never won any titles.

Amador had played for many years in the Second Division.  In 2001, Amador finished third in the Premier Division and in the 2002–03 season, the club was eighth.  The club hasn't returned to the First Division in recent years. As of 2015, the club played in the Second Division.

League and cup history

Island championships

Statistics
Best position: 3rd (regional)

References

Football clubs in São Tomé and Príncipe
Lobata District
São Tomé Island Second Division